Juan Manuel Arostegui (born 2 December 1980 in San Francisco, Córdoba) is a professional Argentine football player. He played for Boca Juniors as well as the Argentina Youth World Cup team.

Arostegui is a former player for MPPJ FC in the Malaysian Super League. With the club he scored 50 goals for MPPJ FC in all competitions in the 2003 season. This was capped off by a hat-trick in the 3–0 win against Sabah FA in the 2003 Malaysia Cup final held in National Stadium, Bukit Jalil, Kuala Lumpur.

The win earned the Petaling Jaya club the accolade of being the only football club in Malaysia to ever win the prestigious Malaysia Cup trophy (all previous winners were state sides of Malaysia).

References

External links
 Juan Arostegui at BDFA.com.ar 
 

1980 births
Living people
People from San Francisco, Córdoba
Argentine footballers
Boca Juniors footballers
Club Atlético Belgrano footballers
Chacarita Juniors footballers
Club Deportivo Universidad Católica footballers
UD Vecindario players
C.F. Pachuca players
Aldosivi footballers
MPPJ FC players
ATM FA players
Sportivo Belgrano footballers
Tercera División players
Argentine Primera División players
Malaysia Super League players
Torneo Federal A players
Primera Nacional players
Serie C players
Expatriate footballers in Chile
Expatriate footballers in Italy
Expatriate footballers in Mexico
Expatriate footballers in Malaysia
Argentine expatriate footballers
Argentine expatriate sportspeople in Italy
Argentine expatriate sportspeople in Mexico
Argentine expatriate sportspeople in Malaysia
Association football forwards
Sportspeople from Córdoba Province, Argentina